Slow Gherkin is an American ska punk band from Santa Cruz, California, United States.

Slow Gherkin was formed in 1993 by AJ Marquez, Zack "ZK" Kent, Phil Boutelle, and James Rickman; they released their first album, Double Happiness, which was distributed by Asian Man Records, on July 29, 1996. They released their second album, Shed Some Skin, in 1998. In 2002, the band released Run Screaming, their final album. The band played a farewell show on August 17 of the same year, but played a sold-out reunion concert at Santa Cruz's Rio Theater on June 18, 2011. In 2016, the band reunited to play at the Asian Man Records 20 year anniversary show and released two new singles on "Lives." In 2018, the band played a few shows in California as well.

Discography 
Death of a Salesman (1994) (7″ vinyl)
Double Happiness (1996) (CD and 12″ vinyl)
Shed Some Skin  (1998) (CD and 12″ vinyl)
Another in Your Life  (1998) (7″ vinyl)
Invisible Tank Slow Gherkin/Jeffries Fan Club split (1998) (CD)
Slow Gherkin/RX Bandits split (1999) (CD)
Roman Holiday (Collection: 1998–2000) (CD)
Run Screaming (2002) (CD)
Hatchet Job Slow Gherkin/Caezer Soze split (2004) (CD)
Death of a Ska Band: Rarities 1994–2002 (2011) (CD)

Current projects 
In 2007, Rickman started The Stitch Up, with MU330 front man Dan Potthast. He plays the bass and adds backup vocals.
Matt Porter and A.J. Marquez are currently in a group The Huxtables. A.J. Marquez, Matt Porter, Phil Boutelle all play in Dan P and the Bricks as well.

References

American ska punk musical groups
Musical groups established in 1993
Asian Man Records artists